Richmond High School was a former public secondary school in Richmond, Virginia. The school's alumni include prominent African Americans and champion runner Lon Myers, a Jew. An 1885 report on Virginia's schools showed dozens of teachers trained at Richmond High School and the teachers serving in various counties.

History
The second Richmond High School building was completed in 1888 and became Garfiel Junior High in 1910 when a new high school complex was built. In 1922 it became an elementary school and was razed in 1956 when a new elementary school replaced it.

The school complexes completed in 1910 and 1941 had an orchestra, auditorium, art gallery, and a gymnasium as part of its complex.

Alumni

Wendell Dabney, who led successful protests of African American students having a separate off campus graduation ceremony
Irving Comer, Arlington County's first African American policeman
Lawrence Myers, a champion short distance runner was in the school's first graduating class
Lefty Bowers, baseball player

References

High schools in Richmond, Virginia